Pretending or Pretend may refer to:

 Role-playing, refers to the changing of one's behaviour to assume a role, either unconsciously to fill a social role, or consciously to act out an adopted role
 "Pretending" (Al Sherman song), a 1946 song with music and lyrics by Al Sherman and Marty Symes
 "Pretending" (Eric Clapton song), a 1989 rock song written and composed by Jerry Lynn Williams
 "Pretending" (HIM song), a song by the Finnish band HIM released in 2001
 "Pretending" (Glee song), a song from US TV series Glee  
 "Pretend" (1952 song), a popular song, written by Lew Douglas, Cliff Parman, and Frank Levere
 "Pretend" (Tinashe song), a 2014 song by Tinashe featuring ASAP Rocky
 "Pretend", a song by Cheri Dennis from In and Out of Love
 "Pretend", a song by Lights from The Listening
 Pretend (album), a 2015 album by Swedish singer and songwriter Seinabo Sey
 "Pretending", a song by SOPHIE from Oil of Every Pearl's Un-Insides
 Pretending, known as Ugly Me in the U.S., 2006 Chilean romantic comedy film
 “Pretend”, a song by Kevin Gates from the 2019 album I'm Him

See also 
 Pretender (disambiguation)